A variety of forms of abuse have been reported in gymnastics, including physical, emotional, and sexual abuse. Abuse has been reported in multiple countries including Australia, Brazil, Portugal, the United Kingdom, and the United States.

See also
USA Gymnastics sex abuse scandal

References

Further reading

Abuse
Gymnastics